Jiangchuan Road is a station on Line 5 of the Shanghai Metro. Located at Jiangchuan Road and Humin Road in the city's Minhang District, the station is located on the main branch of Line 5 and opened as part of the southern extension of Line 5 on 30 December 2018. It is an elevated station.

Between Dongchuan Road and Jiangchuan Road stations, the branch line of Line 5, which branches off to the west toward , connects with the main line. South of this station, Line 5 trains travel on the lower deck of the Minpu Second Bridge over the Huangpu River.

References 

Railway stations in Shanghai
Shanghai Metro stations in Minhang District
Railway stations in China opened in 2018
Line 5, Shanghai Metro